Hollywood Cemetery is a cemetery in Jackson, Tennessee located on Hollywood Drive at Williams Street, about 0.4 miles north of Airways Boulevard.  At present, it occupies a deeded area of 30 acres.
The B'Nai Israel Jewish cemetery is located adjacent to the north-west corner of Hollywood Cemetery.

History
On 17 December 1886 a group incorporated as Hollywood Cemetery.  After purchasing fifty acres of land from Robert Hurt for $3,000 on 23 December 1886, the group founded the cemetery.  By 1900 the cemetery held nearly 100 burials, nine of whom had died before the cemetery was founded and whose graves were relocated from their original locations. In the period to the early 20th century, the cemetery was the chief burial ground for local wealthy and upper-middle-class citizens, which is borne out by its layout, landscaping and many stylish and ornamental monuments.

In 1986, during the cemetery's centennial year, the governing board arranged for all memorials to be surveyed and documented.  Subsequent surveys supplemented the records, and the database can be searched online.

21st Century
Hollywood Cemetery was added to the National Register of Historic Places on 22 May 2003, and is the largest of three cemeteries in Jackson listed, the others being Mount Olivet and Riverside.
In addition to the cemetery's own database, the Findagrave entry for the cemetery includes more than 10,700 memorials, most of which have been photographed.

By February 2020 the cemetery held more than 10,000 graves and had more than 1500 lots for sale.

Notable burials
 Thomas Jefferson Murray, U.S. Representative (1894-1971)
 Herron Carney Pearson, U.S. Representative (1890-1953)

See also
 List of cemeteries in Tennessee.

References

External links
 Hollywood Cemetery Facebook page
 TNGenWeb: Hollywood Cemetery
 Find a Grave.com:  Hollywood Cemetery
 Find a Grave.com:  B'nai Israel Cemetery

Cemeteries on the National Register of Historic Places in Tennessee
Cemeteries in Tennessee
Jackson, Tennessee
National Register of Historic Places in Madison County, Tennessee